Charlie Farah is a former Lebanese international rugby league footballer who has played for the Sydney Bulls in the Ron Massey Cup. He played as a prop.

Farah is a Lebanese international, making ten appearances between 2002 and 2013. Farah is the cousin of former Lebanese and Australian representative Robbie Farah.

References

Living people
Rugby league props
Lebanese rugby league players
Lebanon national rugby league team players
Year of birth missing (living people)